Rank comparison chart of enlisted rank for armies/ land forces of African states.

Enlisted

See also
Comparative army enlisted ranks of the Commonwealth
Ranks and insignia of NATO armies enlisted

References

Military comparisons
Military in Africa